Bromus arvensis, the field brome, is a brome grass native to Europe and Asia. The specific epithet arvensis is Latin, meaning "of cultivated land".

Description

The grass has an extensive fibrous root system. The leaf sheaths are softly pubescent and leaf blades are pubescent on both faces. The straight or slightly curved branches are typically longer than the spikelets. The spikelets have long pedicels and are five to twelve flowered. The bases of florets can be concealed or obvious at maturity. The glumes are glabrous. The margins are translucent and end in lengthy and acute teeth. The caryopses are shorter than the paleas and can be either weakly or strongly rolled inwards.

The grass flowers in June and July.

Habitat and distribution

Bromus arvensis grows along roadsides, in disturbed areas, and in fields. It is native to southern and central Europe, but is now naturalized as a weed throughout temperate regions including North America and Asia. The grass is a soil improver and is useful for erosion control.

References

arvensis
Bunchgrasses of Asia
Bunchgrasses of Europe
Flora of Lebanon
Plants described in 1753
Taxa named by Carl Linnaeus